Alphus is a genus of beetles in the family Cerambycidae, containing the following species:

 Alphus alboguttatus (Melzer, 1935)
 Alphus capixaba Marinoni & Martins, 1978
 Alphus marinonii Souza & Monne, 2013
 Alphus similis Martins, 1985
 Alphus tuberosus (Germar, 1824)

References

Acanthoderini